The men's 100m freestyle S8 event at the 2008 Summer Paralympics took place at the Beijing National Aquatics Center on 8 September. There were two heats; the swimmers with the eight fastest times advanced to the final.

Results

Heats
Competed from 10:42.

Heat 1

Heat 2

Final
Competed at 19:56.

Q = qualified for final. PR = Paralympic record.

References

Swimming at the 2008 Summer Paralympics